Berdyshevo is a rural locality (a selo) in Polozovoskoye Rural Settlement, Bolshesosnovsky District, Perm Krai, Russia. The population was 319 as of 2010. There are 4 streets.

Geography 
Berdyshevo is located 45 km south of Bolshaya Sosnova, the district's administrative centre, by road. Gori is the nearest rural locality.

References 

Rural localities in Bolshesosnovsky District